Wellington East was a parliamentary electorate in the eastern suburbs of Wellington, New Zealand from 1887 to 1890 and from 1905 to 1946. It was succeeded by the Miramar electorate. The electorate was represented by seven Members of Parliament.

Population centres
In the 1887 electoral redistribution, although the Representation Commission was required through the Representation Act 1887 to maintain existing electorates "as far as possible", rapid population growth in the North Island required the transfer of three seats from the South Island to the north. Ten new electorates were created, including Wellington East, and one former electorate was recreated.

The initial electorate was located east of the suburb of Te Aro and included the suburb of Mount Victoria.

In December 1887, the House of Representatives voted to reduce its membership from general electorates from 91 to 70. The 1890 electoral redistribution used the same 1886 census data used for the 1887 electoral redistribution. In addition, three-member electorates were introduced in the four main centres. This resulted in a major restructuring of electorates, and Wellington East became part of the  electorate.

The City of Wellington electorate was split into the Wellington East, and  electorates.

History

Members of Parliament
The electorate was represented by seven Members of Parliament:

Key

Election results

1943 election

1938 election

1935 election

1931 election

1928 election

1925 election

1922 election

1919 election

1914 election

1911 election

 
 
 
 
 
 
|-
|style="background-color:#E9E9E9" ! colspan="6" style="text-align:left;" |Second ballot result
|-

 
 
 
 
 

1908 election

 
 
 
 
 
 
|-
|style="background-color:#E9E9E9" ! colspan="6" style="text-align:left;" |Second ballot result
|-

1905 election

Notes

References

Historical electorates of New Zealand
Politics of the Wellington Region
1887 establishments in New Zealand
1890 disestablishments in New Zealand
1946 disestablishments in New Zealand
1905 establishments in New Zealand